Mother is the only album of British band Kubb. It was released on 14 November 2005 in the UK on the Mercury Records label. It reached a peak of 26 the week of 13 February 2006. The album was never released in the US, although some versions have surfaced stateside (these versions removed the track "Bitch", bringing the album down to 11 tracks).

Track listing
 "Remain" – 3:36
 "I Don't Mind" – 3:49
 "Somebody Else" – 2:54
 "Wicked Soul" – 3:46
 "Grow" – 5:13
 "If I Can't Have You" – 3:26
 "Alcatraz" – 3:18
 "Chemical" – 6:06
 "Sun" – 3:10
 "Without You" – 3:56
 "Bitch" – 3:37
 "Burn Again" – 4:32

B-sides
Arranged in order of single release.

 "Lady Nightmare"
 "Bus Stop"
 "Remain" (Youth edit)
 "Mother"
 "Somebody Else" (Live XFM Session)
 "Wicked Soul" (acoustic)
 "Wicked Soul" (live at V Festival)
 "Lucille"
 "Come Inside"
 "Wicked Soul" (Tim Bran Remix)
 "Chemical" (live at Brixton)
 "For Us"
 "Connection"
 "Thursday"

References

2005 debut albums
Albums produced by Youth (musician)
Kubb (band) albums